Bluebell United Football Club is an Irish association football club originally based in Bluebell, Dublin. The club's senior team plays in the Leinster Senior League Senior Division. The club has also fielded teams to compete in the FAI Cup, the FAI Intermediate Cup and the Leinster Senior Cup. Founded in 1946 in the Camac Park district of Bluebell, the club later relocated to its current home near Clondalkin. In 2014–15, Bluebell were Leinster Senior League champions, 27 years after winning their previous title. Bluebell United would go onto retain the title again in the following 2015-16 season.

History

The club was founded in 1946 in the southern suburbs of Dublin. Its pitch is located on the Naas Road directly opposite The Red Cow, Moran Hotel.

During the 1999 season, a revamp of the football ground was carried out. This project was part funded by a grant from the Irish National Lottery, the remainder was raised by organised events, plus funding from team sponsors and advertisers. All the club's committee members work on a voluntary basis.

In 2020, the club's then manager and a former player were arrested and put on trial for drug trafficking.

Notable players

Republic of Ireland internationals
  Fran Brennan
  Keith Fahey
  Shay Keogh

Republic of Ireland U21 international
  Paul Byrne
  Trevor Molloy
  Richie Towell

Republic of Ireland U19 international
  Mick Cooke

League of Ireland XI representative
  Eddie Byrne

Republic of Ireland manager
  Brian Kerr

Honours 
Competitions won by the club include:
Leinster Senior League
Winners: 1981–82, 1983–84, 1985–86, 1986–87, 2014–15, 2015–16, 2017-18: 7 
Runners-up: 1976–77, 1984–85, 1987–88, 1988–89, 2009–10, 2010–11, 2011–12: 7 ?   
FAI Intermediate Cup
Winners: 1981–82, 1989–90, 1992–93, 1993–94, 1999–2000: 5
Runners-up: 1970–71, 1982–83, 1991–92, 2003–04, 2008–09, 2012–13: 6

References

Leinster Senior League (association football) clubs
1946 establishments in Ireland
Association football clubs in Dublin (city)
Association football clubs established in 1946